Frederick William Ratcliffe  (born 28 May 1927) is an English philologist and librarian. He has a Ph.D. in German, given for his thesis on Heinrich von Mügeln at the University of Manchester. From  1954 he was an assistant librarian or sublibrarian in the universities of Manchester, Glasgow, and Newcastle upon Tyne. He succeeded Moses Tyson as the University Librarian at Manchester in 1965 and from 1972 was additionally director of the John Rylands University Library. In 1980 he became University Librarian at the University of Cambridge where he remained until his retirement in 1994. From 1995 to 2000 he was Parker Librarian at the Parker Library, Corpus Christi College.  He has written a number of papers on the subject of librarianship including the preservation of library materials. He was born in Leek on 28 May 1927.

His son is George Ratcliffe, a professor of plant metabolism at Oxford.

Selected writings 
1966-1980: University of Manchester. Librarian's report, 1966–1980
1980:  "The Scholar in the Academic Library" in: B. C. Bloomfield, ed., Middle East Studies and Libraries: a felicitation volume for Professor J. D. Pearson. London: Mansell Information Publishing; pp. 163–178
1980: "Archival Responsibilities of University Libraries" in Journal of Librarianship and Information Science vol. 12 (1980) pp. 71–83
1982: The Role of the Modern University Library. 23 pp. Darwin
1991: "Preservation and Scholarship in Libraries" in Library Review vol. 40 (1991) pp. 62–71
2007: Books, Books, Just Miles and Miles of Books: across the library counter, 1950–2000. 317 p.; 31 cm. Cambridge: F. W. Ratcliffe (unpublished autobiography, held at Cambridge University Library)

References
Who's Who.
 Pullan, Brian & Abendstern, Michele (2000) A History of the University of Manchester, 1951-73 ; p. 92 Quotation

1927 births
Possibly living people
British philologists
English librarians
Cambridge University Librarians
Commanders of the Order of the British Empire